DeForest is a village in Dane County, Wisconsin, United States, along the Yahara River. The population was 10,811 at the 2020 census. It is part of the Madison Metropolitan Statistical Area.

Name
The village was named for Isaac De Forest, who in 1856 bought the land on which the village sits today.  Its name was long spelled "De Forest," but has since been changed to "DeForest."

Geography

DeForest is located at  (43.245751, −89.345869).

Demographics

2010 census
As of the census of 2010, there were 8,936 people, 3,400 households, and 2,446 families living in the village. The racial makeup of the village was 93.3% White, 2.1% African American, 0.3% Native American, 1.5% Asian, 1.2% from other races, and 1.6% from two or more races. Hispanic or Latino people of any race were 3.6% of the population.

There were 3,400 households, of which 41.7% had children under the age of 18 living with them, 56.1% were married couples living together, 11.0% had a female householder with no husband present, 4.8% had a male householder with no wife present, and 28.1% were non-families. 21.6% of all households were made up of individuals, and 7.7% had someone living alone who was 65 years of age or older. The average household size was 2.63 and the average family size was 3.08.

The median age in the village was 35.6 years. 29% of residents were under the age of 18; 6.3% were between the ages of 18 and 24; 31% were from 25 to 44; 25% were from 45 to 64; and 8.7% were 65 years of age or older. The gender makeup of the village was 48.4% male and 51.6% female.

2000 census
As of the census of 2000, there were 7,368 people, 2,675 households, and 2,000 families living in the village. The population density was 1,525.3 people per square mile (589.0/km2). There were 2,761 housing units at an average density of 571.6 per square mile (220.7/km2). The racial makeup of the village was 95.34% White, 1.48% African American, 0.34% Native American, 0.68% Asian, 0.14% Pacific Islander, 0.62% from other races, and 1.40% from two or more races. Hispanic or Latino people of any race were 2.19% of the population.

There were 2,675 households, out of which 44.9% had children under the age of 18 living with them, 61.4% were married couples living together, 9.8% had a female householder with no husband present, and 25.2% were non-families. 19.3% of all households were made up of individuals, and 7.2% had someone living alone who was 65 years of age or older. The average household size was 2.74 and the average family size was 3.15.

In the village, the population was spread out, with 31.1% under the age of 18, 6.3% from 18 to 24, 36.2% from 25 to 44, 18.3% from 45 to 64, and 8.1% who were 65 years of age or older. The median age was 33 years. For every 100 females, there were 92.8 males. For every 100 females age 18 and over, there were 92.0 males.

The median income for a household in the village was $55,369, and the median income for a family was $60,781. Males had a median income of $40,096 versus $28,000 for females. The per capita income for the village was $21,089. About 1.7% of families and 3.6% of the population were below the poverty line, including 2.7% of those under age 18 and 9.7% of those age 65 or over.

Education
The DeForest Area School District schools include:

DeForest Area High School
 DeForest Area Middle School
 Harvest Intermediate School (under construction, opening September 2021)
 Eagle Point Elementary School
 Windsor Elementary School
 Yahara Elementary School
 Holum Center Half Day Kindergarten

In 2009, DeForest Superintendent Dr. Jon Bales was honored by the Wisconsin Association of School District Administrators as Wisconsin's 2009 Superintendent of the Year.

Yahara Elementary school opened for the 1992-93 school year. Further information: Caldwell v. J. H. Findorff & Son, Inc. lawsuit.

Transportation 
Road

DeForest is double bypassed by I-39/90/94 to the west, with an exit at CTH-V (this area features most of the city's hotels and restaurants). US-51 also has an exit located at CTH-V, on the city's east side.

Railroad

A single rail train track runs north-south through DeForest. This is only used by freight trains; no passenger rail serves DeForest.

Airport

DeForest is close to Dane County Regional Airport, which provides both commercial and general aviation flights.

DeForest Area Public Library 
DeForest Area Public Library serves the DeForest area, including the villages of Windsor and DeForest, and the town of Vienna. It is a member of the South Central Library System.

As of 2009, the library served a population of 17,142, with a collection of over 81,000 items, including books, serials, audios, videos and kits. Circulation topped 405,000 with 200,000 library visits, and 21,000 users of public computers.

The library building, completed in 2002, was modeled after the medieval Stavekirke to highlight the Norwegian heritage of the area. A Wisconsin artist designed the dragons that adorn the roof.

Religion
Local churches include:
 DeForest Evangelical Free Church
 Christ Lutheran Church
 Harvest Church (Assemblies of God)
 Lord of Love Lutheran Church
 Norway Grove Memorial Lutheran Church
 St. Olaf's Catholic Church
 Moravian Church
 United Church of Christ

References

External links
 DeForest Area Historical Society
 Village of DeForest
 Sanborn fire insurance maps: 1894 1912

Villages in Wisconsin
Villages in Dane County, Wisconsin
Madison, Wisconsin, metropolitan statistical area